No Strings Attached – Figurentheater & mehr is a theatre festival in Germany.

External links
 

Theatre festivals in Germany
Events in Rhineland-Palatinate
Culture in Mainz